John Gallaher (born January 6, 1965) is an American poet and assistant professor of English at Northwest Missouri State University, and co-editor of The Laurel Review, supported by Northwest's English Department. He is the author or co-author of five poetry collections, most recently, In a Landscape (BOA Editions, 2014). His honors include the 2005 Levis Poetry Prize for his second book, The Little Book of Guesses (Four Way Books). His poetry has been published in literary journals and magazines including Boston Review, Colorado Review, Crazyhorse, Field, The Literati Quarterly, jubilat, The Journal, Ploughshares, and in anthologies including The Best American Poetry 2008.

Born in Portland, Oregon, Gallaher has lived in Missouri, Kansas, California, Alabama, Long Island, Texas, Arkansas, and Ohio. He received his MFA from Texas State University and his Ph.D from Ohio University, where he worked for a time as an assistant editor of The Ohio Review. He currently resides in Maryville, Missouri, where he teaches creative writing and composition courses at Northwest Missouri State University.

Published works
 In a Landscape (BOA Editions, 2014)
 Your Father on the Train of Ghosts (With G.C. Waldrep)(BOA Editions, 2011)
 Map of the Folded World (University of Akron Press, 2009)
 The Little Book of Guesses (Four Way Books, 2007)
 Gentlemen in Turbans, Ladies in Cauls (Spuyten Duyvil, 2001)

References

External links
 John Gallaher at The Poetry Foundation
 Poems: Boston Review > November/December 2009 > John Gallaher
 Poem: Four Way Books Author Page > On Your Brilliant Escape by John Gallaher
 Poem: Berfrois > Some Other City We Could Travel To by John Gallaher
 Author Page: University of Akron Press > John Gallaher
 Author Listing: Poets & Writers > Directory of Writers > John Gallaher
 Review: Publishers Weekly > Fiction Reviews: 8/17/2009 > Review of Map of the Folded World by John Gallaher

American male poets
Living people
1965 births
Poets from Oregon
Poets from Missouri
Writers from Portland, Oregon
Ohio University alumni
Texas State University alumni
Northwest Missouri State University faculty
American academics of English literature
American male non-fiction writers
21st-century American poets
21st-century American male writers